Jessica Lange's first venture into the world of photography came with winning a scholarship to study fine arts at the University of Minnesota in 1967. During her first semester however, she left school in favor of traveling to Paris with then soon-to-be husband Francisco Grande. She would not pick up photographing again until the early 1990s when she began to make  black-and-white pictures, all of places she visited on her travels since then.

Prior to the release of her debut monograph, 50 Photographs (2008), the Aperture magazine devoted to fine art photography introduced selections from the photo-book in their spring issue of 2007. The work itself with an introduction written by Patti Smith went on public the following year, on November 18 through powerHouse Books and a distribution by Random House. Simultaneously, Lange promoted some of her pictures at Howard Greenberg Gallery in New York City. Her subsequent presentations included shows in three art venues, such as Butler Institute of American Art in Youngstown, Ohio, ROSEGALLERY in Santa Monica, California and A Gallery for Fine Photography in New Orleans, Louisiana; both in 2009. The George Eastman House - International Museum of Photography & Film in Rochester, New York hosted the artist from July to September that year. Except for her photo show, the museum arranged a retrospective series of her films and a tribute evening at Dryden Theater. Besides, Lange received the first George Eastman House Honors Award for her lifetime contribution. At the turn of the years 2010 and 2011, artist showcased in New Orleans for the second time. For this occasion though, she contributed with a thematic collection of her own pictures taken by Walker Evans during the 1930s in Louisiana; all presented for the local Ogden Museum of Southern Art.

Her second book saw its eventual release in 2010 on RM in two co-editions. One for the English-speaking world called In Mexico, the other for the Hispanophone region and under name En México, featuring Spanish texts by Julio Trujillo. Initial promotions of the art work took place in Mexico itself; first at Centro Fotográfico Álvarez Bravo in Oaxaca and, after that, at Casa de las Ajaracas and Galería Hispánica Contemporánea, both in Mexico City. She also showcased in Europe, at the 1st edition of the Festival international d'art contemporain in Saint-Rémy-de-Provence, France. In 2011, Lange's exhibition went on a worldwide tour including additional countries, such as Spain on four separate occasions (2011-2012 and 2015), Portugal (2012), California (2013) and Russia (2014). Within the South American-region, her work was presented in Brazil (2015). Most recently, Lange released a children's picture book called It's About a Little Bird, issued through Sourcebooks Jabberwocky on October 1, 2013.

Bibliography

Photo-books

Children's literature

Art exhibitions

2008–2009: United States

2011–2017: Americas and Europe

2019–2021: United States

Other appearances

Art fairs and festivals

Other events

See also
 Jessica Lange awards 
 Jessica Lange discography
 Jessica Lange filmography

Footnotes

References

Sources

External links
Jessica Lange – Profile - Artworks - Exhibits at ArtSlant

Bibliography
Bibliographies by writer
Bibliographies of American writers